Fannie M. Buzzell was an American Republican politician from Hudson, Massachusetts. She represented the 10th Middlesex district in the Massachusetts House of Representatives from 1945 to 1948.

See also
 1945-1946 Massachusetts legislature
 1947-1948 Massachusetts legislature

References

Year of birth missing
Year of death missing
Members of the Massachusetts House of Representatives
Women state legislators in Massachusetts
20th-century American women politicians
20th-century American politicians
People from Hudson, Massachusetts